Rector is a city in southeast Clay County, Arkansas, United States. The population was 1,977 at the 2010 census.

History
Rector is named after Governor Henry Massey Rector (1816–1899).

Geography
Rector is located in southern Clay County along the southeastern edge of Crowley's Ridge. U.S. Route 49 passes through the city, leading northeast  to Piggott and southwest  to Marmaduke. In the southern part of the city, Arkansas Highway 90 (Main Street) intersects US 49.

Though a small portion of the town and surrounding area lies along Crowley’s Ridge, the majority of the town and surrounding land is flat and well-suited to farming.

Demographics

2020 census

As of the 2020 United States census, there were 1,862 people, 805 households, and 460 families residing in the city.

2000 census
As of the census of 2000, the racial makeup of the city was 98.26% White, 0.55% Native American, 0.20% Asian, and 0.99% from two or more races.  0.89% of the population were Hispanic or Latino of any race.

There were  households, out of which 25.4% had children under the age of 18 living with them, 48.6% were married couples living together, 10.8% had a female householder with no husband present, and 37.6% were non-families. 35.7% of all households were made up of individuals, and 24.8% had someone living alone who was 65 years of age or older.  The average household size was 2.20 and the average family size was 2.83.

In the city, the population was spread out, with 21.7% under the age of 18, 7.3% from 18 to 24, 22.7% from 25 to 44, 23.8% from 45 to 64, and 24.5% who were 65 years of age or older.  The median age was 44 years. For every 100 females, there were 83.4 males.  For every 100 females age 18 and over, there were 76.8 males.

The median income for a household in the city was $21,051, and the median income for a family was $29,330. Males had a median income of $27,650 versus $19,293 for females. The per capita income for the city was $14,931.  About 17.9% of families and 23.9% of the population were below the poverty line, including 33.3% of those under age 18 and 31.6% of those age 65 or over.

Annual cultural events
The Rector Labor Day Picnic features a rodeo, a parade, beauty pageants, and is a popular political campaign stop.

Education 
Public education is primarily provided by the Rector School District, which leads to graduation from Rector High School. The Rector School District was known as Clay County Central School District from 1985 until 2000. The current school district mascot is the cougar.

Notable people

Dale Alford, member of the United States House of Representatives for Arkansas's 5th congressional district, 1959 to 1963; reared in Rector
Jerry Bookout, Arkansas politician
Bill Carter, entertainment, law, Gaither Homecoming Videos
Edwin A. Doss, colonel for the United States Air Force
Maurice Copeland, actor
Skeets McDonald, Rockabilly artist, famous for the song "Don't Let the Stars Get in Your Eyes"

References

External links

Cities in Clay County, Arkansas
Cities in Arkansas
Populated places established in 1881
1881 establishments in Arkansas